It  means "one who is ever new". It is of fairly recent creation and has been used for boys and girls. It is also used in places other than Punjab and Himachal Pradesh. 

Navneet is a name in India of  origin derived from the Sanskrit word "नवनीत" meaning "eternally new".

The name Navneet is mentioned in the Mahabharata as a name of Lord Kṛṣṇa .

References

Indian unisex given names